Dorian Schuyler Abbot is an American geophysicist. He is an associate professor at the University of Chicago.

Education 
Abbot completed a A.B. (2004) in physics and a S.M. (2004) and Ph.D. (2008) in applied mathematics at the Harvard John A. Paulson School of Engineering and Applied Sciences. His dissertation was titled A high-latitude convective cloud feedback. From 2008 to 2009, he was a postdoctoral researcher in the Department of Earth and Planetary Sciences at Harvard University. Abbot conducted post doctoral research in geophysical sciences from 2009 to 2011 at the University of Chicago.

Career 
Abbot became an assistant professor of geophysical sciences at University of Chicago in 2011. He became an associate professor in 2015. Abbot uses low-order mathematical models and numerical models to research climates, paleoclimates, planetary habitability, and exoplanets.

In early 2020, Abbot was invited to give the John Carlson Lecture at the Massachusetts Institute of Technology, a public science outreach event, which was delayed to 2021; however, his lecture was cancelled in 2021 after protesters cited a Newsweek editorial co-written by Abbot with Stanford professor Ivan Marinovic. In the editorial Abbot and Marinovic argued for greater focus on academic excellence and individual achievement in University admissions, suggested scrapping legacy and athletic admission advantages and criticized some aspects of Equity, Diversity and Inclusion initiatives; in the last paragraph they made a comparison to the purging of academics in Nazi Germany.  MIT explained the cancellation by stating that the public outreach lecture was meant to showcase a role model who inspires a broad group of young people, and they instead invited Abbot to give a standard departmental seminar at MIT. Abbot ultimately delivered his lecture on planetary science to a large audience hosted by the James Madison Program in American Ideals and Institutions at Princeton University on the same day as the canceled event. Abbot was a guest on Tucker Carlson Tonight and CNN to discuss the cancellation and received a Hero of Intellectual Freedom Award from the American Council of Trustees and Alumni.

Publications
Abbot's most cited publications are:

Hoffman PF, Abbot DS, Ashkenazy Y, Benn DI, Brocks JJ, Cohen PA, Cox GM, Creveling JR, Donnadieu Y, Erwin DH, Fairchild IJ. Snowball Earth climate dynamics and Cryogenian geology-geobiology. Science Advances. 2017 Nov 1;3(11):e1600983.  open access. According to Google Scholar, cited  248 times 
Palmer PI, Abbot DS, Fu TM, Jacob DJ, Chance K, Kurosu TP, Guenther A, Wiedinmyer C, Stanton JC, Pilling MJ, Pressley SN. Quantifying the seasonal and interannual variability of North American isoprene emissions using satellite observations of the formaldehyde column. Journal of Geophysical Research: Atmospheres. 2006 Jun 27;111(D12). open access. According to Google Scholar, cited 245 times  
Yang J, Cowan NB, Abbot DS. Stabilizing cloud feedback dramatically expands the habitable zone of tidally locked planets. The Astrophysical Journal Letters. 2013 Jun 27;771(2):L45. According to Google Scholar, cited 225 times  
Abbot DS, Voigt A, Koll D. The Jormungand global climate state and implications for Neoproterozoic glaciations. Journal of Geophysical Research: Atmospheres. 2011 Sep 27;116(D18).  open access. According to Google Scholar, cited 245 times  
Yang J, Boué G, Fabrycky DC, Abbot DS. Strong dependence of the inner edge of the habitable zone on planetary rotation rate. The Astrophysical Journal Letters. 2014 Apr 25;787(1):L2. According to Google Scholar, cited 136 times  
Abbot DS, Cowan NB, Ciesla FJ. Indication of insensitivity of planetary weathering behavior and habitable zone to surface land fraction. The Astrophysical Journal. 2012 Aug 24;756(2):178. According to Google Scholar, cited 129 times

References

External links 
 
 
 

Living people
Place of birth missing (living people)
Year of birth missing (living people)
American geophysicists
21st-century American physicists
21st-century American mathematicians
21st-century American geologists
Harvard School of Engineering and Applied Sciences alumni
University of Chicago faculty